This is a list of ballooning accidents by date. It shows the number of fatalities associated with various accidents that involved manned balloons, such as Montgolfiere hot-air balloons, Charliere gas balloons, or de-Roziere gas and hot-air hybrid balloons. This list does not include non-fatal accidents, or accidents involving other types of aerostat/lighter-than-air aircraft (i.e. dirigibles, blimps, zeppelins, airships, etc.).

List

See also
 List of airship accidents

References

Ballooning by death toll
Ballooning accidents and incidents by death toll
Ballooning by death toll